Ioan Suciu (December 4, 1907 – June 27, 1953) was a Romanian bishop of the Greek-Catholic Church, born into a clerical family in Blaj.

He studied in Rome, Italy first at Sant'Atanasio and then at the Pontificium Institutum Internationale Angelicum, the future Pontifical University of Saint Thomas Aquinas, Angelicum where after six years of study he received a Doctorate in Sacred Theology on 29 November 1931, and was ordained to the priesthood.

He was consecrated Auxiliary Bishop of Oradea in 1940.

He was eventually sent to the notorious Sighet Prison, where he died of illness. 

Streets are named after him in Oradea and Satu Mare.

On June 2, 2019, Suciu and six other Romanian prelates were beatified by Pope Francis at Câmpia Libertății in Blaj.

Notes

1907 births
1953 deaths
People from Blaj
Romanian Greek-Catholic bishops
Romanian beatified people
Romanian anti-communist clergy
Prisoners who died in Securitate custody
Inmates of Sighet prison
Romanian people who died in prison custody
Beatifications by Pope Francis
Eastern Catholic bishops in Romania
Pontifical University of Saint Thomas Aquinas alumni